Kwon Ki-ok (11 January 1901 – 19 April 1988), or Quan Jiyu in Chinese, was the first Korean female aviator, as well as one of the first female pilots in China. She went into exile in China during the Japanese occupation of Korea, and became a lieutenant colonel in the Republic of China Air Force. She returned home after the independence of Korea and became a founder of the Republic of Korea Air Force.

Early life
Kwon was born in Pyongyang's Sangsugu Village to Gwon Don-gak and Jang Mun-myeong, the second of five children (4 daughters and 1 son).

Career
Kwon attended Pyongyang's Sunghyeon School, from which she graduated in 1918; she was inspired to learn to fly after seeing a 1917 aerobatics demonstration by American stunt pilot Art Smith.

The following year, she participated in the March 1st Movement, for which she spent three weeks in jail; after her release, she assisted with fundraising activities for the Korean Patriotic Women's Association, as a result of which she was arrested and imprisoned for six months. Upon her release, she went into exile in China. In China, she enrolled in the Hongdao Women's School in Hangzhou, operated by American missionary Ellen Peterson, in order to learn Chinese and English. She completed a four-year course of study in just two years.

In 1923, at the recommendation of the Provisional Government of the Republic of Korea in Shanghai, she entered the Republic of China Air Force School in Yunnan, graduating in 1925. She was the only woman in the first graduating class. After graduation, she was stationed in Beijing, and then relocated to Nanjing in 1927. By 1940, she had achieved the rank of lieutenant colonel.

In 1945, with the end of World War II and the restoration of Korean independence, Kwon returned to Korea, where she was instrumental in the founding of the Republic of Korea Air Force. During the Korean War, she served as a member of South Korea's Ministry of National Defense. Following the war, she retired to private life, serving as the vice-president of the Korea-China Cultural Association from 1966 until 1975. She received various recognitions for her service to the country, including a 1968 presidential commendation and the 1977 Order of Merit for National Foundation. She died on 19 April 1988 and was buried in the National Cemetery in Dongjak-gu, Seoul.

Later views
In August 2003, Kwon was selected as "Independence Activist of the Month" by the Ministry of Patriots' and Veterans' Affairs. At the time of the release of the 2005 South Korean film Blue Swallow, Park Kyung-won was believed to have been Korea's first female aviator; as knowledge that Kwon actually preceded her became more widespread, the distributor was forced to change their marketing campaign.

See also
An Chang-nam
Feng Ru

Footnotes

References

Further reading

1901 births
1988 deaths
Aviation pioneers
Women aviators
Korean aviators
People from Pyongyang
Republic of China Air Force personnel
Korean expatriates in China
Recipients of the Order of Merit for National Foundation
Women in war in China
Women in World War II
Burials at Seoul National Cemetery